Dzhanek is a town in the Almaty Region of south-eastern Kazakhstan. It is a northern suburb of Almaty.

External links
Tageo.com

Populated places in Almaty Region